Charles Alexandre Dupuy (5 November 1851 – 23 July 1923) was a French statesman, three times prime minister.

Biography
He was born in Le Puy-en-Velay, Haute-Loire, Auvergne, where his father was a minor official.  After a period as a professor of philosophy in the provinces, he was appointed a school inspector, thus obtaining a practical acquaintance with the needs of French education. In 1885 he was elected to the chamber as an Opportunist Republican. After acting as "reporter" of the budget for public instruction, he became minister for the department, in Alexandre Ribot's cabinet, in 1892. In April 1893 he formed a ministry himself, taking as his office that of minister of the interior, but resigned at the end of November, and on 5 December was elected president of the chamber. During his first week of office an anarchist, Vaillant, who had managed to gain admission to the chamber, threw a bomb at the president, and Dupuy's calm response --"Messieurs, la séance continue" – gained him much credit.

In May 1894 he again became premier and minister of the interior; and he was at President Carnot's side when Carnot was stabbed to death at Lyons in June. He then stood for the presidency, but was defeated, and his cabinet remained in office till January 1895; under this government, Alfred Dreyfus was arrested and condemned (23 December 1894). The progress of the Dreyfus Affair cast its shadow over Dupuy, along with other French "ministrables," but in November 1898, after Henri Brisson had at last remitted the case to the judgment of the court of cassation, he formed a cabinet of Republican concentration.

During Dupuy's time as prime minister, a number of progressive reforms were carried out. A law implemented in June 1894 introduced a form of social insurance through a mutual fund for miners' welfare and retirement, while a law passed in November 1894 introduced the Credit Agricole mutualist savings bank for farmers. In addition, a law passed that same month set out the role of the state-owned Caisse des depots "in the construction and management of subsidised housing".

In view of the apparent likelihood that the judges of the criminal division of the court of cassation—who formed the ordinary tribunal for such an appeal—would decide in favour of Dreyfus, it was thought that Dupuy's new cabinet would be strong enough to reconcile public opinion to such a result; but, to the surprise of outside observers, Dupuy proposed a law in the chamber transferring the decision to a full court of all the divisions of the court of cassation. This arbitrary act, though adopted by the chamber, was construed as a fresh attempt to maintain the judgment of the first court-martial.  In the interim, President Félix Faure (an anti-Dreyfusard) died, and the accession of Émile Loubet helped placate the public. The whole court of cassation decided that there must be a new court-martial, and Dupuy at once resigned (June 1899). 
Although none of Dupuy's presidential bids were successful, he served, due to his position as Prime Minister, as an Acting President of the French Republic for three separate occasions during vacancies.

In June 1900 Dupuy was elected senator for the Haute-Loire department.
He was reelected on 7 January 1906 and 11 January 1920, holding office until his death on 23 July 1923.

Dupuy's first ministry, 4 April 1893 – 3 December 1893
Charles Dupuy – President of the Council and Minister of the Interior
Jules Develle – Minister of Foreign Affairs
Julien Léon Loizillon – Minister of War
Paul Peytral – Minister of Finance
Eugène Guérin – Minister of Justice
Louis Terrier – Minister of Commerce, Industry, and Colonies
Auguste Alfred Lefèvre – Minister of Marine
Raymond Poincaré – Minister of Public Instruction, Fine Arts, and Worship
Albert Viger – Minister of Agriculture
Jules Viette – Minister of Public Works

Dupuy's second ministry, 30 May 1894 – 26 January 1895
Charles Dupuy – President of the Council and Minister of the Interior and of Worship
Gabriel Hanotaux – Minister of Foreign Affairs
Auguste Mercier – Minister of War
Raymond Poincaré – Minister of Finance
Eugène Guérin – Minister of Justice
Félix Faure – Minister of Marine
Georges Leygues – Minister of Public Instruction and Fine Arts
Albert Viger – Minister of Agriculture
Théophile Delcassé – Minister of Colonies
Louis Barthou – Minister of Public Works
Victor Lourties – Minister of Commerce and Industry and of Posts and Telegraphs

Dupuy's third ministry, 1 November 1898 – 22 June 1899
Charles Dupuy – President of the Council and Minister of the Interior and Worship
Théophile Delcassé – Minister of Foreign Affairs
Charles de Freycinet – Minister of War
Paul Peytral – Minister of Finance
Georges Lebret – Minister of Justice
Édouard Locroy – Minister of Marine
Georges Leygues – Minister of Public Instruction and Fine Arts
Albert Viger – Minister of Agriculture
Florent Guillain – Minister of Colonies
Camille Krantz – Minister of Public Works
Paul Delombre – Minister of Commerce and Industry and of Posts and Telegraphs

Changes
6 May 1899 – Camille Krantz succeeds Freycinet as Minister of War.  Jean Monestier succeeds Krantz as Minister of Public Works.

References

Sources

1851 births
1923 deaths
19th-century heads of state of France
People from Le Puy-en-Velay
Politicians from Auvergne-Rhône-Alpes
Progressive Republicans (France)
Prime Ministers of France
French interior ministers
Presidents of the Chamber of Deputies (France)
Members of the 4th Chamber of Deputies of the French Third Republic
Members of the 5th Chamber of Deputies of the French Third Republic
Members of the 6th Chamber of Deputies of the French Third Republic
Members of the 7th Chamber of Deputies of the French Third Republic
French Senators of the Third Republic
Senators of Haute-Loire
École Normale Supérieure alumni